John Phifer Farm is a historic farm complex and national historic district located near Cleveland, Rowan County, North Carolina, United States.  The Jacob Phifer House was built in the 1850s, and is a two-story, rectangular, weatherboarded log dwelling. The oldest building is the John Phifer House, built about 1819, and is a small two-story log dwelling. Other contributing resources are the double-pen log barn (c. 1858), tool shed (1930s), garage (1920s / 1930s), granary and corn crib (c. 1858), spring house (c. 1930), blacksmith shop (c. 1925), two chicken houses (1930s, c. 1940), log chicken coop (1930s), wood shed (c. 1930), smokehouse (c. 1858), privy (c. 1930), scalding vat (c. 1935), log tobacco barn (c. 1895), and the farm landscape.

It was listed on the National Register of Historic Places in 1990.

References

Log houses in the United States
Farms on the National Register of Historic Places in North Carolina
Historic districts on the National Register of Historic Places in North Carolina
Houses completed in 1856
Buildings and structures in Rowan County, North Carolina
National Register of Historic Places in Rowan County, North Carolina
Log buildings and structures on the National Register of Historic Places in North Carolina